Showkat Malek Jahanbani (born 1908) was an Iranian educator and politician. In 1963 she was one of the first group of women elected to the National Consultative Assembly.

Biography
Jahanbani was born in 1908. She attended Tehran Teachers Training College and subsequently became a 'pioneer in girl's education', establishing several schools and becoming headmistress of a school in southern Tehran.

Women were granted the right to vote in 1963, and in the parliamentary elections that year, Jahanbani was one of six women elected to the National Consultative Assembly. She was re-elected in 1967 and 1971, and then had one term in the Senate.

References

1908 births
Iranian educators
20th-century Iranian women politicians
20th-century Iranian politicians
Deputies of Tehran for National Consultative Assembly
Members of the 21st Iranian Majlis
Members of the 22nd Iranian Majlis
Members of the 23rd Iranian Majlis
Members of the Senate of Iran
Date of death unknown